The 2014 Northeast Conference men's soccer season will be the 34th season of men's varsity soccer in the conference.

The Central Connecticut Blue Devils are the defending regular season champions, while the St. Francis Brooklyn Terriers are the defending tournament champions.

Saint Francis (PA) won the Regular Season Championship by going 6-1-0 in conference play and will host the NEC Tournament in Loretto, Pennsylvania. St. Francis Brooklyn won the 2014 NEC Tournament Championship with the 3rd seed by beating Bryant (2–0) then Saint Francis (PA) (2–1).

Changes from 2013 

 None

Teams

Stadia and locations

Regular season

Results

Honors 

Player of the Year: Neco Brett (Robert Morris)
Defensive Player of the Year: Francis de Vries (Saint Francis (PA))
Rookie of the Year: Filosmar Cordiero (Central Connecticut)
Coach of the Year: Michael Casper (Saint Francis (PA))

2014 NEC First Team All-Conference

Postseason

NEC Tournament

NCAA tournament

References 

 
2014 NCAA Division I men's soccer season